James W. Nichol (born 1940 in Toronto, Ontario) is a Canadian playwright and novelist. His first novel, Midnight Cab, won the Arthur Ellis Award for Best First Novel, and was shortlisted for the CWA Gold Dagger. He was also short-listed for the Arthur Ellis Award for Best Novel in 2009.  He was the vice-president of Playwrights Canada and was playwright-in-residence at the National Art Centre.

Novels
Midnight Cab (2002)
Death Spiral (2013)
Transgression (2013)

Plays
Tub (1969)
Sweet Home Sweet (1972)
The Book of Solomon Spring (1972)
Gwendoline (1978)
Child (1979)
Sonny (1982)
Relative Strangers (1983)
When I Wake (1984)
The Three True Loves of Jasmine Hoover (1986)
The Stone Angel (adapted from Margaret Laurence's The Stone Angel) (1995)
Dr. Jeckyll and Mr. Hyde: A Love Story (1995–1996)

Personal life
Nichol lives in Stratford, Ontario, Canada.

References

External links
Publisher's author page

1940 births
Canadian crime fiction writers
Canadian male novelists
20th-century Canadian dramatists and playwrights
20th-century Canadian novelists
Living people
Writers from Toronto
Canadian male dramatists and playwrights
20th-century Canadian male writers